Jauravia soror, is a species of lady beetle native to India, and Sri Lanka.

Description
Body length is about 2.5 to 2.8 mm. Body sub-hemispherical. Dorsum reddish brown to reddish testaceous. External elytral borders are shiny and much lighter. Ventrum is brown. Epipleura of prothorax, elytra, and legs are yellowish-brown. Head very finely and fairly densely punctate. Pubescence on head is whitish, long and sparse. Pronotum deeply emarginate anteriorly. Elytral punctation is fine and close and clothed with whitish, long and sparse pubescence. Elytral punctures are fine, shallow and less dense. Elytral interspaces are coriaceous, shiny and clothed with white, long, sub-erect and sparse pubescence. Ventrum finely and sparsely punetate, and clothed with yellowish white, short, delicate, sub-depressed and sparse pubescence.

It is a predator of Hemaspidoproctus cinereus, Tetranychus bioculatus, Raoiella indica, Trialeurodes ricini and Dialeurodes citri.

References 

Coccinellidae
Insects of Sri Lanka
Beetles described in 1892